Mihail Stepanovich Litvinchuk (born 21 June 1980) is a Belarusian former professional footballer.

Career
Born in Brest, Litvinchuk has spent most of his career playing football in the Belarusian Premier League. He has won the league twice with FC Dinamo Brest, once with FC Minsk and once with FC Gomel. He has also played abroad with Świt Nowy Dwór Mazowiecki and Podlasie Biała Podlaska.

Honours
Gomel
Belarusian Cup winner: 2010–11

References

External links

1980 births
Living people
Belarusian footballers
Association football forwards
Belarusian expatriate footballers
Expatriate footballers in Poland
FC Dynamo Brest players
Świt Nowy Dwór Mazowiecki players
FC SKVICH Minsk players
FC Torpedo-BelAZ Zhodino players
FC Minsk players
FC Smorgon players
FC Gomel players
FC Gorodeya players
FC Slutsk players
FC Kobrin players
Sportspeople from Brest, Belarus